Domenico Olivieri (born 16 January 1968) is a Belgian football manager, and former footballer who played as a defender. He is currently the assistant manager of Genk.

Career
As a player, Olivieri played for Waterschei Thor, Genk, Seraing, and Louviéroise. He was best known for his stint at Genk, where he became their captain and led them to their first ever Belgian First Division A trophy in  the 1998–99 season.

Managerial career
Olivieri coached the reserves of Genk from 2006 to 2017. In 2017, he was promoted as Genk's assistant manager. He was briefly appointed the interim manager for Genk in November 2019, and again in September 2020.

Personal life
Born in Belgium, Olivieri is of Italian descent.

Honours
Seraing
Belgian Third Division: 1990–91
Belgian Second Division: 1992–93

Genk
Belgian First Division A: 1998–99
Belgian Cup: 1997–98, 1999–00

La Louvière
Belgian Cup: 2002–03

References

External links
 
 
 

1968 births
Living people
Sportspeople from Genk
Belgian footballers
Belgian football managers
Belgian people of Italian descent
K. Waterschei S.V. Thor Genk players
K.R.C. Genk players
R.F.C. Seraing (1904) players
R.A.A. Louviéroise players
K.R.C. Genk managers
Belgian Pro League players
Belgian Pro League managers
Association football defenders
Footballers from Limburg (Belgium)